{{Speciesbox
| image = Oberthur 1884EtudEnt4PlateII.jpg
| image2 = 
| image_caption =  Chalinga  elwesi   in Oberthür Études d’entomologie (vol. IX, plate II)
| genus = Chalinga
| species = elwesi
| authority = (Charles Oberthür) <ref> Oberthür, C. 1883 Annales de la Société entomologique de France (6) 3: 128–129. </ref>
| synonyms =
}}Chalinga elwesi  is an East Palearctic butterfly in the family Nymphalidae (Limenitidinae). 

It is found in China and Tibet. The larva  feeds on Populus  and Salix'' .

References

Chalinga
Butterflies described in 1883